Dixon High School may refer to:

Dixon High School (California) - Dixon, California
Dixon High School (Illinois) - Dixon, Illinois
Dixon High School (Missouri) - Dixon, Missouri, a high school in Pulaski County
Dixon High School (North Carolina) - Holly Ridge, North Carolina, a high school in Holly Ridge, North Carolina